WUAL-FM (91.5 FM) is an American non-commercial educational radio station licensed to serve Tuscaloosa, Alabama. The station, established in 1972, is owned by the University of Alabama, and is the flagship affiliate of Alabama Public Radio, airing the network's programming consisting of news and talk programming, classical music, folk music, jazz, adult album alternative, and nostalgic music programs.  
The station's 100,000–watt signal covers a region extending from beyond Birmingham to the east to beyond the state line of Mississippi to the west.

See also
Alabama Public Radio

References

External links
APR official website

UAL-FM
NPR member stations
Radio stations established in 1972
University of Alabama